State Route 73 (SR 73) is a  state highway in the eastern part of the U.S. state of Georgia. It connects Glennville with the South Carolina state line, via Claxton, Statesboro, Dover, and Sylvania. Except for a brief portion in the Sylvania area, it is completely concurrent with U.S. Route 301 (US 301). Its southern terminus is at US 25/US 301/SR 23/SR 57 and SR 144 in Glennville. Its northern terminus is at the South Carolina state line, east of Millhaven, where US 301 enters that state.

Route description

Tattnall County
SR 73 begins concurrent with US 25/US 301 (Veterans Boulevard) at an intersection with SR 144 (Barnard Street) in Glennville, within the southeastern part of Tattnall County. This intersection is the northern end of the concurrency of US 25/US 301 with SR 23/SR 57. Here, US 25, US 301, and SR 73 travel to the north-northeast, through  a mostly commercial area. Just before an intersection with the eastern terminus of Cloverdale Road, they begin a curve to the north-northwest. They leave the city limits of Glennville and curve back to the north-northeast. They cross over Beards Creek just before passing Smith State Prison. They intersect the southern terminus of Hugh Driggers Road and the western terminus of Bird Ford Lake Road, the latter of which leads to the Smith State Prison Training Center. The concurrency meets what was the southern terminus of former SR 250 just before traveling through Gooseneck. The three highways pass Groover Pond and then enter the south-central part of Evans County.

Evans County
US 25, US 301, and SR 73 cross over Grice Creek and then enter the community of Deans Crossing. There, they intersect the eastern terminus of Bay Branch Church Road and the western terminus of Green Cypress Church Road, the latter of which leads to Evans County Landfill. Just past this community, they pass Evans County Fire Rescue Station No. 5. After they pass Dyess Pond, they cross over Bull Creek. The three highways curve back to the north-northwest and pass Richards Pond. Then, they curve to a nearly due north direction. They pass Claxton Elementary School just before entering Claxton, where it is known as South Duval Street and is also known as Norman W. Fries Memorial Highway. In downtown, they cross over some railroad tracks of Georgia Central Railway and then intersect US 280/SR 30/SR 129 (Main Street, also known as Albert Parker Highway). Here, the concurrency becomes known as North Duval Street. Just south of an intersection with the eastern terminus of MLK Jr. Drive and the western terminus of East Long Street, they begin a curve to the northeast. At the northern end of this curve, they leave the city limits of Claxton. They pass Smith Transitional Center, the Women's Probation Detention Center, and the Evans County Maintenance Facility, before intersecting the northern terminus of an entrance road to the Claxton Poultry Farms. They pass Rocks River Park just before crossing over the Canoochee River on the Earnest W. Strickland Memorial Bridge. After passing the Claxton–Evans County Airport, US 25, US 301, and SR 73 curve to the north-northwest. Just after curving back to the north-northeast, they pass Lewis Pond and cross over Rocky Branch. After passing Beasley Pond and crossing over Thick Creek, the highways curve to the north. They intersect the northern terminus of SR 169 and the southern terminus of Caddie Green Road. They pass Oliffs Pond. After curving back to the north-northeast, they enter Bulloch County.

Bulloch County
US 25, US 301, and SR 73 immediately curve back to the north-northwest and cross over Scott Creek. After curving back to the north-northeast, they pass Nevils Pond. They curve back to the north-northwest and have an interchange with Interstate 16 (I-16; Jim Gillis Highway). The concurrency becomes known as Jones Lane Memorial Highway. The three highways curve back to the north-northeast and then intersect SR 46. After curving to the northeast, they cross over Lotts Creek and then begin paralleling some railroad tracks of Norfolk Southern Railway (NS). They pass East Georgia State College's Statesboro campus, a Georgia State Patrol post, and Ogeechee Technical College just before entering Statesboro. Immediately after entering the city limits, they intersect SR 67 Byp., as well as the southern terminus of US 25 Byp., US 301 Byp., and SR 73 Byp. (Veterans Memorial Parkway). They intersect the eastern terminus of Rucker Lane and the western terminus of Old Register Road, the latter of which leads to Georgia Southern University (GSU). A short distance later, they meet the northern terminus of Parrish Drive, which also leads to GSU. Just before the intersection with the southern terminus of Azalea Drive, the three highways curve to the north-northeast. At this intersection, they begin paralleling the eastern edge of W. Jones Lane Memorial Park. They intersect the northern terminus of Southern Drive, which is the last access road for GSU. They cross over Beautiful Eagle Creek and then intersect Tillman Road. Here, they leave the memorial park and enter downtown Statesboro. They cross over Little Lotts Creek and then over the NS railroad line they were paralleling. Then, they intersect SR 67 (Fair Road), which joins the concurrency. The four highways intersect Grady Street, which leads to the city's police and fire departments. Just north of this intersection, they pass the Statesboro–Bulloch County Library. An intersection with the eastern terminus of Bulloch Street leads to the Statesboro–Bulloch County Recycling Center. An intersection with the eastern terminus of West Main Street and the western terminus of East Main Street leads to Averitt Arts Center. On the northeastern corner of this intersection is the Bulloch County Courthouse. Just south of an intersection with the eastern terminus of Elm Street, the concurrency curves to the north-northwest. They intersect US 80/SR 26 (Northside Drive). Here, US 25 and SR 67 depart the concurrency to the left. At an intersection with Parrish Street, US 301 and SR 73 turn right and travel to the east-northeast and make a very gradual curve to the northeast. Just before an intersection with the southern terminus of Mathews Road, they cross over the NS railroad line. They intersect the northern terminus of US 301 Byp./SR 73 Byp. (Veterans Memorial Parkway), which leads to Willingway Hospital. This intersection is immediately before the highways leave Statesboro. They cross over Mill Creek then curve to the north-northeast. They intersect the eastern terminus of Holland Industrial Park and the western terminus of Statesboro Airport Road, the latter of which leads to Statesboro–Bulloch County Airport. They travel through rural areas of the county and cross over the Ogeechee River and enter Screven County.

Screven County
US 301 and SR 73 become known as the H. Walstein Parker Memorial Highway. They intersect the southern terminus of Dover Road, which leads to Dover. They travel on a bridge over some railroad tracks of Norfolk Southern. In Cooperville, they intersect SR 17. Almost immediately after this intersection, they curve to the north. They begin paralleling Simmons Branch just before curving back to the north-northeast. Just north of an intersection with the eastern terminus of Jackson Branch Road, they leave Simmons Branch. They cross over the South Fork Ogeechee Creek and passes Lee Pond. The two highways travel through Goloid before crossing over Ogeechee Creek. Almost immediately after entering Sylvania, they intersect the southern terminus of Waters Station Road. Here, just one block to the west, is the southern terminus of Frontage Road West, a frontage road for US 301. Just north of Waters Station Road, they begin a curve to the north-northwest. Almost immediately, they intersect SR 21 (Sylvania Bypass), which joins the concurrency. Just past this intersection, SR 73 splits off of US 301 to the east-northeast. This intersection is the southern terminus of SR 73 Loop, which is US 301's companion state highway through most of the Sylvania area. SR 73 takes on the name of West Ogeechee Street. Immediately, SR 73 curves back to the north-northeast. Immediately, it intersects the southern terminus of Frontage Road East, another frontage road for US 301. It passes Bennett Lake and then curves to the east-northeast. It intersects SR 21 Bus. (Mims Road), which leads to Optim Medical Center – Screven. SR 21 Bus. begins a concurrency with SR 73. They intersect the northern terminus of Lewis Place and the southern terminus of South Community Drive, the latter of which leads to Screven County Library. They travel on a bridge over some railroad tracks of Ogeechee Railway. At an intersection with South Main Street, where the city hall of Sylvania is located, SR 21 Bus. splits off to the south-southeast. SR 73 turns left onto North Main Street and travels to the north-northwest. It then curves to the north and crosses over Buck Creek before an intersection with the southern terminus of Habersham Road and the western terminus of Torrington Road. It then meets the northern terminus of Frontage Road East before intersecting US 301 and the northern terminus of SR 73 Loop. Here, US 301 and SR 73 begin their second concurrency. They head to the north and curve to the north-northeast before they cross over Indian Branch. They curve back to the north. After bending back to the north-northwest, they begin a concurrency with SR 24. Immediately, they cross over Beaverdam Creek on the Jacksonboro Bridge. A short distance later, SR 24 splits off from the concurrency to the north-northwest. Then, they curve to the northeast and cross over Brier Creek. They cross over Beaverdam Creek again. They curve to the east-northeast and pass the Georgia Welcome Center. Then, they cross over the Savannah River on the Burton's Ferry Bridge, where US 301 enters South Carolina. At the state line, SR 73 ends.

National Highway System
The following portions of SR 73 are part of the National Highway System, a system of routes determined to be the most important for the nation's economy, mobility, and defense:
From I-16, south-southeast of Register, to the northern end of the southern concurrency with US 301, southwest of Sylvania
The entire length of the northern concurrency with US 301, from the northern part of Sylvania to the South Carolina state line east of Millhaven

History
The roadway that would eventually become SR 73 was established between January 1, 1920 and September 23, 1921 as part of SR 26 southwest of Statesboro. SR 73 was established between November 1930 and January 1932 between US 280/SR 30 in Claxton north-northeast to SR 26 southwest of Statesboro. A northern segment was also established from SR 24 north of Sylvania northeast to the South Carolina state line. The next month, the paths of SR 26 and SR 46 west of Statesboro were swapped. Between November 1932 and May 1933, a central segment of SR 73 was established between US 80/SR 26 in Statesboro and SR 21 in Sylvania. There is no indication as to whether this segment connected to either of the previously-established ones. Between April and October 1934, SR 73 was extended south-southwest from Claxton to SR 23 in Glennville. Between September 1938 and July 1939, US 25 was designated on the path of SR 73 from Glennville to southwest of Statesboro and on SR 46 (and possibly SR 73) from this point to Statesboro.

Between November 1946 and February 1948, US 301  was designated on the entire length of each segment of SR 73 (and US 25), and on SR 46 and SR 24 between them. By April 1949, SR 24 was extended to the southeast, with a concurrency with US 301/SR 73 north-northeast of Sylvania. Between June 1963 and January 1966, the path of SR 46 southwest of Statesboro was shifted to the southeast. Its former path, on US 25, was indicated to be part of SR 73. In 1970, SR 73 Loop was designated on its proposed path, with US 301 shifted onto it. US 301's former path was redesignated as US 301 Business (US 301 Bus.).

Major intersections

Special routes

Glennville bypass

State Route 73 Bypass (SR 73 Byp.) was a bypass for SR 73 that partially existed in Glennville. Between the beginning of 1945 and the end of 1946, it was established from SR 144 in the eastern part of the city to US 25/SR 73 north of it. By February 1948, it was extended southwest, west, and west-northwest to US 25/US 301/SR 23 in the southern part of the city. By April 1949, it was truncated to its previous southern terminus. In 1953, the bypass was extended again, this time just slightly to SR 144 Loop. Between June 1963 and the end of 1965, it was truncated again to its original southern terminus. In 1985, the bypass was decommissioned.

Statesboro bypass

State Route 73 Bypass (SR 73 Byp.) is a  four-lane bypass of SR 73. It travels south-to-north in the southern and eastern parts of the city of Statesboro. It is completely concurrent with U.S. Route 301 Bypass (US 301 Byp.) for its entire length. US 301 Byp./SR 73 Byp., along with US 25 Byp. (and SR 67 Byp.), makes up the Veterans Memorial Parkway, which forms a near circle around the southern part of the city. The entire length of SR 73 Byp. is part of the National Highway System, a system of routes determined to be the most important for the nation's economy, mobility, and defense. The Veterans Memorial Parkway was established in 1993.

Sylvania loop route

State Route 73 Loop (SR 73 Loop) is a  loop route of SR 73 that exists in the western part of Sylvania. It is completely concurrent with US 301. It is the only special route of SR 73 that is not concurrent with a special route of US 301.

The loop begins concurrent with US 301/SR 21 just southwest of the city limits of Sylvania. This intersection is the northern end of SR 73's southern concurrency with US 301. The three highways travel to the north-northwest, just west of the city. They have a frontage road on the western side of the roadway. A short distance later, a frontage road on the eastern side of the roadway joins it. They pass Screven County Elementary School, with the east frontage road having access to it. They curve to the north-northeast and intersect Rocky Ford Road, which leads to Screven County's agricultural center, public works department, landfill, and prison, as well as a Georgia State Patrol post, the sheriff's department, and Rocky Ford. They meet the western terminus of SR 21 Bus. (Mims Road). At this intersection, SR 21 splits off to the northwest. US 301 and SR 73 Loop then cross over some railroad tracks of Norfolk Southern Railway. They curve to the east-northeast and have an intersection with the northern terminus of Singleton Avenue and the southern terminus of Buttermilk Road. They begin a curve back to the north-northeast and have an intersection with Habersham Road. The eastern frontage road ends before they intersect SR 73 (North Main Street). Here, SR 73 Loop ends, and SR 73 begins its northern concurrency with US 301.

The entire length of SR 73 Loop is part of the National Highway System, a system of routes determined to be the most important for the nation's economy, mobility, and defense.

A central segment of SR 73 was built between US 80/SR 26 in Statesboro and SR 21 in Sylvania between November 1932 and May 1933. Between June 1963 and January 1966, a western bypass of the city, designated as SR 73 Loop, was proposed between two intersections with US 301/SR 73 (one south-southwest of the city and the other north-northwest of it). In 1970, it was established on this path, with US 301 being shifted onto it. US 301's former path through the city (on SR 73) was redesignated as US 301 Business (US 301 Bus.). In 1993, the path of SR 21 in Sylvania was shifted to the southwest, replacing the entire length of SR 829 and on a concurrency with US 301/SR 73 Loop. Its former path was redesignated as SR 21 Bus.

See also

References

External links

0073
Transportation in Tattnall County, Georgia
Transportation in Evans County, Georgia
Transportation in Bulloch County, Georgia
Transportation in Screven County, Georgia